The 1923 Santa Barbara State Roadrunners football team represented Santa Barbara State during the 1923 college football season.

Santa Barbara State competed as an independent in 1923. Records may be incomplete, but six games have been documented. The Roadrunners were led by second-year head coach Otho J. Gilliland and played home games in Santa Barbara, California. They finished the season with a record of two wins and four losses (2–4). Overall, the team was outscored by its opponents 71–95 for the season.

Schedule

Notes

References

Santa Barbara State
UC Santa Barbara Gauchos football seasons
Santa Barbara State Roadrunners football